The Bibliotheca Teubneriana, or Bibliotheca Scriptorum Graecorum et Romanorum Teubneriana, also known as Teubner editions of Greek and Latin texts, comprise one of the most thorough modern collection published of ancient (and some medieval) Greco-Roman literature. The series consists of critical editions by leading scholars. They now always come with a full critical apparatus on each page, although during the nineteenth century there were editiones minores, published either without critical apparatuses or with abbreviated textual appendices, and editiones maiores, published with a full apparatus.

Teubneriana is an abbreviation used to denote mainly a single volume of the series (fully: editio Teubneriana), rarely the whole collection; correspondingly, Oxoniensis is used with reference to the Scriptorum Classicorum Bibliotheca Oxoniensis, mentioned above as Oxford Classical Texts.

The only comparable publishing ventures producing authoritative scholarly reference editions of numerous ancient authors, are the Oxford Classical Texts and the Collection Budé (whose volumes also include facing-page French translations with notes; the Loeb Classical Library, with facing-page English translations and notes, aims at a more general audience).

History of the series 

In 1811, Benedictus Gotthelf Teubner (1784–1856) refounded in his own name a printing operation he had directed since 1806, the Weinedelsche Buchdruckerei, giving rise to the Leipzig publishing house of B.G. Teubner (its imprint, in Latin, in aedibus B.G. Teubneri).  The volumes of the Bibliotheca Teubneriana began to appear in 1849.  Although today Teubner editions are relatively expensive, they were originally introduced to fill the need, then unmet, for low-priced but high-quality editions.

Prior to the introduction of the Teubner series, accurate editions of antique authors could only be purchased by libraries and rich private scholars because of their expense.  Students and other individuals of modest means had to rely on editions which were affordable but also filled with errors.  To satisfy the need for accurate and affordable editions Teubner introduced the Bibliotheca Teubneriana.

In the 19th century, Teubner offered both affordable editiones maiores (with a full critical apparatus) for scholars, and low-priced editiones minores (without critical apparatuses or with abbreviated textual appendices) for students.  Eventually, editiones minores were dropped from the series and Teubner began to offer only scholarly reference editions of ancient authors.

During the period between the end of World War II and German reunification, the publishing house of B.G. Teubner split into two firms, Teubner KG (with Teubner Buch GmbH and Teubner Redaktions GmbH), later  B. G. Teubner Verlagsgesellschaft, in Leipzig in East Germany, and Verlag B. G. Teubner / BG Teubner GmbH in Stuttgart in West Germany.  Both offered volumes in the Bibliotheca Teubneriana.

After the fall of the Berlin wall and the reunification of Germany, B.G. Teubner was also reunited (B. G. Teubner Verlagsgesellschaft mbH) and subsequently consolidated its headquarters at Wiesbaden.

In late 1999, B.G. Teubner Verlag announced their intention to concentrate on scientific and technical publishing.  All their Classical Studies titles, including the Biblotheca Teubneriana, were sold to K.G. Saur, a publisher based in Munich.  Although new volumes began to appear with the imprint in aedibus K.G. Saur, the name of the series remained unchanged.

In 2006, the publishing firm of Walter de Gruyter acquired K.G. Saur and their entire publishing range, including the Bibliotheca Teubneriana. Since January 2007, the Bibliotheca Teubneriana is being exclusively published by Walter de Gruyter GmbH & Co. KG. As of 1 May 2007, the new North American distributor of titles from the Bibliotheca Teubneriana is Walter de Gruyter, Inc.

Greek type in Teubner editions 

While the typography of the Greek Teubners has been subject to innovations over the years, an overview of the whole series shows a great deal of consistency.  The old-fashioned, cursive font used (with small variations) in most of the existing volumes is instantly recognized by classicists and strongly associated with Teubner.

Original "Teubner" font 

This type was in regular use at least from the 1870s to the 1970s, for verse and prose texts.  In older (e.g., nineteenth-century) Teubners, several old-fashioned features of the type (almost crabbed by the Porsonian standard more familiar in the English-speaking world) are still found which would later be smoothed away, for example, omega with bent-in ends, medial sigma that is not completely closed, and phi with a bent stem.

Upright variant 

  Teubner used an upright type, designed to match the original cursive type, in some editions.  In the example shown, the cursive type is still used in the critical apparatus.  In other editions (for example, Aristotelis Athenaion politeia, ed. M. Chambers, Leipzig, 1986), this upright font is used throughout.

Digital descendants 
  Beginning in the 1990s, the digital production of books has been marked by new digital fonts, sometimes based on Teubner's older traditions.  In the 1990s, individual editions of Euripides' tragedies were digitally typeset in a font apparently based on the original Teubner cursive.  There have also been recent innovations in upright type.  One of these, which may be seen in Bernabé's edition of the Orphica, seems likely to be the current standard for new Teubners from K.G. Saur.

Griechische Antiqua 

Some Teubner Greek editions made a bold typographic departure from the tradition outlined above.  E.J. Kenney considered this twentieth-century experiment to be a refreshing break from the Porsonian norm, and emblematic of the best kind of modernist simplicity and directness: More recently there has been a welcome and long overdue return to the older and purer models.  The pleasing modification of M.E. Pinder's "Griechische Antiqua" used by Teubner in some of their editions represents a lost opportunity, having been regrettably abandoned in favour of the "dull and lumpish" fount (Victor Scholderer's words) that is still the uniform of the series.  Kenney referred to Bruno Snell's Bacchylides edition of 1934; closely comparable is the Philodemus example illustrated here.  A slightly less radical version of this font (notably without lunate sigma) was used in some later Teubner editions (and in non-Teubner publications such as Rahlfs' Septuaginta of 1935), and M. L. West's recent edition of the Iliad uses a digital font that seems closer to this type than to the main Teubner tradition.

See also 
 Stiftung Benedictus Gotthelf Teubner
 VEB Akademische Verlagsgesellschaft (AVG)
 Verlag Harri Deutsch
 Edition Leipzig
 Collection Budé
 Loeb Classical Library

References

Further reading 
  (x+595+5 pages) (NB. This work is based on the thesis of the author at Friedrich-Alexander-Universität Erlangen-Nürnberg in 2016.)

External links 
 Bibliotheca scriptorum Graecorum et Romanorum Teubneriana a list of titles from the publisher, De Gruyter. Click on the VOLUMES tab.
 A Teubner a Day - links to digital copies of volumes in the public domain.

Series of books
Typography
Classics publications
Classical philology
Editorial collections